The Liechtenstein national ice hockey team is the national ice hockey team of Liechtenstein, and an associate member of the International Ice Hockey Federation.

History
Liechtenstein were first admitted to the International Ice Hockey Federation as an associate member in 2001. In 2003, Liechtenstein played their first international game, a friendly against Luxembourg losing 7–1. They again played Luxembourg in 2007 in another friendly losing 4–2.

In the summer of 2021, the national team was successfully reactivated. As a result, in May 2022 Liechtenstein participated for the first time in the IIHF Development Cup in Füssen, Germany, an international tournament for federations that cannot participate in World Championships. After victories against Ireland (7:6), Portugal (3:0), Algeria (11:2) and Andorra (8:4) and a defeat against tournament winner Colombia (1:3), the team finished second among six teams.

All-time record against other nations
As of 28 November 2022

References

External links
  Liechtensteiner Eishockey und Inline Verband Offizielle Webseite
 IIHF Official Site

National ice hockey teams in Europe
Ice hockey
Ice hockey in Liechtenstein